Baroniella is a genus of flowering plants belonging to the family Apocynaceae.

Its native range is Madagascar.

Species:

Baroniella acuminata 
Baroniella camptocarpoides 
Baroniella capillacea 
Baroniella collaris 
Baroniella effusa 
Baroniella ensifolia 
Baroniella linearifolia 
Baroniella linearis 
Baroniella longicornis 
Baroniella multiflora

References

Apocynaceae
Apocynaceae genera